Craig Powell may refer to:

 Craig Powell (American football) (born 1971), American football player
 Craig Powell (musician) (born 1984), British musician
 Craig Powell (poet) (born 1940), Australian poet